Sunesen is a Danish surname. People with the surname include:

 Anders Sunesen (c. 1167 – 1228), Danish archbishop
 Gitte Sunesen (born 1971), Danish handball player
 Susanne Sunesen (born 1977), Danish para-equestrian

Danish-language surnames